Donato Maria Dell'Olio (Bisceglie, 27 December 1847 – Benevento, 18 January 1902) was an Italian cardinal and Catholic archbishop.

Biography
Dell'Olio studied at the seminary in Bisceglie and then at the Pontifical University of Saint Thomas Aquinas in Rome where his professors included the future cardinal Tommaso Maria Zigliara. In 1873 he received the rank of Doctor of Theology.

Dell'Olio was ordained as a priest on 23 December 1871. In 1876 he became professor of philosophy and theology at the seminary in Bisceglie. In 1882 he founded the institute "Giovanni Bosco".

On 14 December 1891, Dell'Olio was elected archbishop of Rossano and on 20 December of the same year he was consecrated as bishop in Rome by cardinal Raffaele Monaco La Valletta.

On 5 February 1898 Dell'Olio was promoted to Archbishop of Benevento. The diocese welcomed him on 29 May 1898. In that city he founded the Ateneo Pontificio in 1899.

In Dell'Olio's speech at the inauguration of the institution, the cardinal said:

Pope Leo XIII raised Dell'Olio to the rank of cardinal in the Papal consistory of 15 April 1901 and he received the titular church of Santa Balbina.

On 16 June 1901 Dell'Olio was in Benevento to consecrate the Basilica della Madonna delle Grazie and its altar which was "a splendid gift from the munificence of Leo XIII."

Dell'Olio died at Benevento at the age of 54 and his body was buried in the city of Benevento in the old cemetery of Santa Clementina.

Bibliography
 
sac. (Rev.) Ferdinando Grassi, I Pastori della cattedra beneventana, tipografia-auxiliatrix-Benevento 1969;
Donato Maria Dell'Olio, discorso per l'inaugurazione dell' Ateneo nella città di Benevento, Tip. De Martini, Benevento 1899.

External links
 Biography on the website Cardinals by Salvador Miranda
Official website of the archdiocese of Benevento
Biography on catholic-hierarchy.org

1847 births
1902 deaths
20th-century Italian cardinals
Archbishops of Benevento
Cardinals created by Pope Leo XIII
19th-century Italian Roman Catholic archbishops